Andrew Mark Armitage (born 17 October 1968) is an English former footballer who played as a defender for Rochdale. He began his career as with Leeds United as a trainee.

References

Living people
1968 births
English footballers
Footballers from Leeds
Association football defenders
Rochdale A.F.C. players
Leeds United F.C. players
Guiseley A.F.C. players